Charles David Ginsburg (April 20, 1912 – May 23, 2010) was an American political advisor and lawyer who was among the founders of Americans for Democratic Action and served as executive director of the Kerner Commission, which warned that the U.S. was "moving toward two societies—one black, one white, separate and unequal."

Early life and education

Ginsburg was born in Manhattan on April 20, 1912, and moved with his family to Huntington, West Virginia as a child. He graduated from West Virginia University in 1932 and earned his law degree from Harvard Law School in 1935.

After graduating from law school, he found a position at the U.S. Securities and Exchange Commission, with the assistance of Felix Frankfurter, interrupted by a one-year-long Supreme Court clerkship with Associate Justice William O. Douglas. During World War II, Ginsburg served on the staff of the Office of Price Administration from 1941 until his resignation in 1943, where his hires included Richard Nixon, who had just graduated from the Duke University School of Law. Criticized for attempting to use influence to obtain a commission as an officer, President Franklin D. Roosevelt came to his support, writing that "when the political storms blow over..., David’s patriotic, unselfish and distinguished service to his country will be duly recognized."

Ultimately, Ginsburg enlisted as a private in the United States Army, where he drove trucks for a supply unit. He later earned the rank of captain and served on the staff of General Lucius D. Clay, the Military Governor of the U.S. Occupation Zone in Germany. There he provided guidance in the rebuilding and reconstruction of the German economy and attended portions of the Nuremberg Trials and the Potsdam Conference.

Legal career
After completing his military service, Ginsburg returned to Washington, where he founded a law firm and became the founders of Americans for Democratic Action. As counsel to the Jewish Agency and adviser to Chaim Weizmann, he paved the way for Harry S. Truman's recognition of the state of Israel in 1948.

President Lyndon B. Johnson appointed Ginsburg in 1967 to serve as executive director of the National Advisory Commission on Civil Disorders, commonly known as the Kerner Commission after its chair, Governor Otto Kerner, Jr. of Illinois. In the wake of inner city riots in the late 1960s, the commission's report became a surprise best seller, warning that the unrest by African-Americans was a result of systematic white racism in which the United States was "moving toward two societies—one black, one white, separate and unequal."  Ginsburg wrote that "white society is deeply implicated in the ghetto.., White institutions created it, white institutions maintain it and white society condones it." Johnson broke his relationship with Ginsburg after the release of the report, upset that his presidential efforts to defend the civil rights of all Americans were not credited in the report. Decades later, Ginsburg remained pessimistic about the future of race relations, citing the continued lag in education, housing and employment by African-Americans.

He served as general counsel to the Democratic National Committee during the 1968 presidential campaign and helped craft Hubert Humphrey's campaign platform opposing the Vietnam War.

As attorney for Henry Kissinger, Ginsburg successfully fought to prevent the release of transcripts of Kissinger's phone conversations with President Richard Nixon as falling outside the purview of the Freedom of Information Act. The position was supported by the U.S. Supreme Court in a 5 to 2 verdict in Kissinger v. Reporters Committee for Freedom of the Press on the basis of the fact that the discussions were not related to the executive branch of government.

Family
Ginsburg died at age 98 of congestive heart failure on May 23, 2010, in his home in Alexandria, Virginia. He was survived by his third wife, Marianne Lais Ginsburg, as well as a daughter, two sons and two grandchildren.

See also 
 List of law clerks of the Supreme Court of the United States (Seat 4)

References

External links

1912 births
2010 deaths
United States Army personnel of World War II
Harvard Law School alumni
Law clerks of the Supreme Court of the United States
Lawyers from Alexandria, Virginia
Lawyers from Huntington, West Virginia
People from Manhattan
United States Army officers
West Virginia University alumni
Franklin D. Roosevelt administration personnel
Military personnel from Huntington, West Virginia